Halberstadt (Eastphalian: Halverstidde) is a town in the German state of Saxony-Anhalt, the capital of Harz district. Located north of the Harz mountain range, it is known for its old town center that was greatly destroyed by Allied bombings in late stages of World War II after local Nazi leaders refused to surrender. The town was rebuilt in the following decades.

In World War I, Halberstadt was the site of a German military airbase and aircraft manufacturing facilities. In World War II, Halberstadt was a regional production center for Junkers aircraft, which also housed an SS forced labor camp. Halberstadt now encompasses the area where the Langenstein-Zwieberge concentration camp existed.

Geography 

Halberstadt is situated between the Harz in the south and the Huy hills in the north on the Holtemme and Goldbach rivers, both left tributaries of the Bode. Halberstadt is the base of the Department of Public Management of the Hochschule Harz University of Applied Studies and Research.

The town center retains many important historic buildings and much of its ancient townscape. Notable places in Halberstadt include Halberstadt Cathedral, the Church of Our Lady (Liebfrauenkirche) and St Martin's, churches built in the 12th and 13th centuries. Halberstadt is the site of the first documented large, permanent pipe organ installation in 1361. The cathedral is notable among those in northern European towns in having retained its medieval treasury in virtually complete condition. Among its treasures are the oldest surviving tapestries in Europe, dating from the 12th century. The town is also a stop on the scenic German Timber-Frame Road.

The town can be reached via the Bundesstraße 6n (since 2019 called Bundesautobahn 36), 79, 81, and 245 federal highways. Halberstadt station is an important railway hub on the Magdeburg–Thale and Halle–Vienenburg lines, mainly served by Transdev Sachsen-Anhalt. The Halberstadt tramway network currently operates two lines.

Germania Halberstadt is a football club that plays in Halberstadt.

Divisions
The town Halberstadt consists of Halberstadt proper and the following Ortschaften or municipal divisions:
Aspenstedt
Athenstedt
Emersleben
Klein Quenstedt
Langenstein
Sargstedt
Schachdorf Ströbeck

These are all formerly independent municipalities: Emersleben was absorbed into Halberstadt in 1995, Klein Quenstedt in 1996, and Aspenstedt, Athenstedt, Langenstein, Sargstedt and Schachdorf Ströbeck in 2010.

History

In 814 the Carolingian emperor Louis the Pious made the Christian mission in the German stem duchy of Saxony the episcopal see of the Diocese of Halberstadt. It was vested with market rights by King Otto III in 989. The town became the administrative centre of the Saxon Harzgau and an important trading location. The Halberstadt bishops had the Church of Our Lady erected from about 1005 onwards. In his fierce conflict with Emperor Frederick Barbarossa, the forces of the Saxon duke Henry the Lion devastated the town in 1179.

Upon Henry's downfall, the Halberstadt diocese was elevated to a prince-bishopric about 1180. Its cathedral was rebuilt from 1236 and consecrated in 1491. Halberstadt, Quedlinburg and Aschersleben joined a league of towns (Halberstädter Dreistädtebund) in 1326; from 1387, the city was also a member of the Hanse.

From 1479, the diocese was administrated by the Archbishops of Magdeburg. While the Halberstadt citizens turned Protestant around 1540, the cathedral chapter elected Prince Henry Julius of Brunswick-Wolfenbüttel first Lutheran bishop in 1566. During the Thirty Years' War, the town was occupied by the troops of Albrecht von Wallenstein in 1629 and temporarily re-Catholicized according to the imperial Edict of Restitution. According to the 1648 Peace of Westphalia, the prince-bishopric was finally secularized to the Principality of Halberstadt held by Brandenburg-Prussia. The first secular governor was Joachim Friedrich von Blumenthal.

Halberstadt became part of the newly established Kingdom of Prussia in 1701. From 1747 Johann Wilhelm Ludwig Gleim worked here as a government official and made his home an intellectual center of the Enlightenment (Aufklärung) movement. Upon the 1807 Treaty of Tilsit, the town became part of the Kingdom of Westphalia, a Napoleonic client-state, and administrative seat of the Westphalian Department of Saale. On 29 July 1809, a Westphalian regiment was defeated by the Black Brunswickers under Prince Frederick William of Brunswick-Wolfenbüttel in the Battle of Halberstadt.

After the defeat of Napoleon, the town was restored to Prussia and subsequently administered within the Province of Saxony. From 1815, Halberstadt was home of garrison of the Prussian 7th (Magdeburg) Cuirassiers "von Seydlitz" regiment, with Otto von Bismarck in the rank of an officer à la suite from 1868. The town's economy was decisively promoted by the opening of the Magdeburg–Halberstadt Railway in 1843. The tramway was inaugurated in 1903. 

In 1912 the Halberstädter Flugzeugwerke aircraft manufacturer was founded followed by the opening of a military airbase, providing the German Luftstreitkräfte in World War I. After the war it had to close down according to the regulations of the Treaty of Versailles, until in the course of the German re-armament, it opened again in 1935 as a branch of the Junkers company in Dessau. The aircraft factory was the site of an SS forced labor camp, one of several subcamps of Buchenwald; the production facilities and the nearby Luftwaffe airbase were targets of Allied bombing during the 'Big Week' in February 1944.

In the last days of World War II, in April 1945, US forces approached Halberstadt as they attacked remaining Nazi troops in the short-lived Harz pocket. They dropped leaflets instructing Halberstadt's Nazi ruler to fly a white flag on the town hall as a token of surrender. He refused, no white flag was raised and on 8 April 1945, 218 Flying Fortresses of the 8th Air Force, accompanied by 239 escort fighters, dropped 595 tons of bombs on the center of Halberstadt. This killed about 2,500 people and converted most of the old town into some 1.5 million cubic meters of rubble, which American troops briefly occupied three days later. By June 1945, the town and its garrison was handed over to the 3rd Shock Army of the Soviet Red Army forces.

Halberstadt was part of newly established Saxony-Anhalt from 1945–1952, after which it was within Bezirk Magdeburg in East Germany. During the Peaceful Revolution in Autumn 1989, St Martin's Church was a center of the Swords to ploughshares movement. After the reunification of Germany, Halberstadt became part of the restored state of Saxony-Anhalt.

Jewish culture
Halberstadt's Jewish community is mentioned in records from the 13th century and the town had a synagogue in 1464.  In the early 18th century, Halberstadt had one of the largest Jewish communities in central Europe and was known as a center of theology and learning after Berend Lehmann (1661–1730) founded a beth midrash there in 1703. The building, called the"Klaus", included a library and living quarters for scholars to study the Talmud. Lehmann also financed an impressive Baroque synagogue that was completed in 1712.

Halberstadt's synagogue was ransacked and burned in the 9 November 1938 Kristallnacht pogrom. The synagogue's Torah scrolls were removed and burned in the street. On 18 November 1938, the local building authority ordered the demolition of the synagogue and required the Jewish community to pay the cost of the work.

Today the Moses Mendelssohn Academy is based in the "Klaus", providing exhibitions,  presentations, and information about Jewish culture.

One of the world's slowest, longest "concerts"

A performance of John Cage's organ piece As Slow As Possible began in the Burchardikirche in Halberstadt in September 2001; the performance is scheduled to take 639 years. The concert began on 5 September 2001 with a rest lasting 17 months. On the dates of the sound changes the church is usually well visited.

Education

Halberstadt is site of the Harz University of Applied Studies.

Notable people
 Caspar Abel, theologian, historian, and poet
 Albert of Saxony (philosopher), logician, physicist, and Bishop of Halberstadt from 1366–1399
 Johann Christian Josef Abs, teacher and school administrator
 August Binkebank, Trompeter der Halberstädter Kürassiere, Freiligraths Trompeter von Mars-la-Tour
 Martin Bormann, private secretary to Adolf Hitler
 Lily Braun, feminist writer
 Wibke Bruhns, journalist and author, author of My Father's Country 
 Gottfried August Bürger, poet
 , Circus director, founder of the Carré Theatre
 Karl Friedrich von Dacheröden, lawyer
 Johann Augustus Eberhard, theologian and philosopher
 Johann Wilhelm Ludwig Gleim, poet
 Adalbert of Hamburg, Archbishop of Hamburg-Bremen
 Ferdinand Heine, ornithologist
 Azriel Hildesheimer, rabbi
 Gustav Eduard von Hindersin, general
 Johann Georg Jacobi, poet
 Israel Jacobson, philanthropist and father of Reform Judaism
 Alexander Kluge, film director and author
 Issachar Berend Lehmann, banker, merchant, diplomatic agent and army contractor
 Paul Laurentius, theologian
 George Müller, Christian evangelist and administrator of orphanages
 Emil D. Munch, American politician
 Adolf Reubke, organ builder
 Eberhard Graf von Schmettow, general
 Jürgen Sparwasser, footballer and manager
 Adolf Stoecker, theologian and politician
 Friederike Vohs (1777–1860), operatic soprano
 Helmut Weidling, general 
 Andreas Werckmeister, organist and music theorist, from 1696 to 1706
 Walter Wislicenus, astronomer
 Carl Zillier, American politician

Twin towns – sister cities

Halberstadt is twinned with:
 Banská Bystrica, Slovakia
 Náchod, Czech Republic
 Villars, France
 Wolfsburg, Germany

See also
 Bishopric of Halberstadt, a Roman Catholic diocese and state of the Holy Roman Empire until the Peace of Westphalia
 Principality of Halberstadt, the secularized successor to the Bishopric of Halberstadt after the Peace of Westphalia

References

External links

 Official Webpage
 Moses Mendelssohn Akademie
 

 
Towns in the Harz
Historic Jewish communities
Members of the Hanseatic League
Holocaust locations in Germany